Six-Party Talks was a variety show program aired by KBS2. Originally, the pilot was formed, but the regular formation was canceled.

Broadcast time

List of episodes and Ratings

References

2019 South Korean television series debuts
Korean-language television shows
2019 South Korean television series endings